United: NYC was a professional wrestling pay-per-view (PPV) event produced by Dragon Gate USA that was second live Internet pay-per-view. It took place on January 28, 2011 at B.B. King's Blues Club & Grill in New York, New York.

References

External links
DGUSA.tv

Dragon Gate USA shows
2011 in professional wrestling
Events in New York City
2011 in New York City
Professional wrestling in New York City